Chikkballapur Lok Sabha constituency, also spelled 'Chikkaballapur', is one of the 28 Lok Sabha (parliamentary) constituencies in Karnataka state in southern India. This constituency came into existence in 1977 after the reorganisation of Indian states. It covers parts of Chikkaballapura District and Bengaluru Rural District.

Vidhan Sabha segments
Chikballapur Lok Sabha constituency presently comprises the following eight Legislative Assembly segments:

Members of Lok Sabha

Mysore State

Election results

2019

2014

2009

1977 Lok Sabha
 M. V. Krishnappa (INC) : 207,589 votes   
 G. Narayana Gowda (Janata) : 159,115

See also
 Hoskote Lok Sabha constituency
 Chikballapur district
 List of Constituencies of the Lok Sabha

References

External links
Chikkballapur lok sabha  constituency election 2019 date and schedule

Lok Sabha constituencies in Karnataka
Chikkaballapur district